The 1930–31 Tercera División season was the third season since its establishment.

Group 1

League table

Group 2

League table

Group 3

Group 3A

League table

Group 3B

League table

Group 3 finals

Promotion play-off

Semi-final

Tiebreaker

Finals

External links
RSSSF 
Futbolme 

Tercera División seasons
3
Spain